Yasser Al-Rawashdeh (born April 21, 1990) is a Jordanian professional footballer who plays as a right-back for Jordanian club Ma'an and the Jordan national team.

International goals

With U-23

International career statistics

Honours
Jordan Premier League: 2016–17
Jordan FA Cup: 2014–15, 2016–17
Jordan Super Cup: 2015, 2017

References

External links 
 
 
 
 

Jordan international footballers
Al-Faisaly SC players
Al-Arabi (Jordan) players
Al-Salt SC players
Ma'an SC players
Jordanian Pro League players
Jordanian footballers
Association football midfielders
Footballers at the 2010 Asian Games
1990 births
Living people
Asian Games competitors for Jordan